Antillogorgia is a genus of soft coral, sea fans in the family Gorgoniidae.

Species
The World Register of Marine Species lists the following species:

Antillogorgia acerosa (Pallas, 1766)
Antillogorgia albatrossae Bayer, 1961
Antillogorgia americana (Gmelin, 1791)
Antillogorgia bipinnata (Verrill, 1864)
Antillogorgia blanquillensis (Stiasny, 1941)
Antillogorgia elisabethae Bayer, 1961
Antillogorgia hummelincki Bayer, 1961
Antillogorgia hystrix Bayer, 1961
Antillogorgia kallos (Bielschowsky, 1918)
Antillogorgia navia Bayer, 1961
Antillogorgia rigida (Bielschowsky, 1929)

References 

Gorgoniidae
Octocorallia genera